Ostrowce may refer to the following places in Poland:
Ostrowce, Masovian Voivodeship (east-central Poland)
Ostrowce, Świętokrzyskie Voivodeship (south-central Poland)
Ostrówce, Kuyavian-Pomeranian Voivodeship (north-central Poland)